Garcia Massingale (June 22, 1928 – November 28, 1990) was an American Negro league baseball player in the 1940s.

A native of Kansas City, Kansas, Massingale played for the Kansas City Monarchs in 1945. He died in Seattle, Washington in 1990 at age 62.

References

External links
 and Seamheads

1928 births
1990 deaths
Kansas City Monarchs players
Baseball players from Kansas
Sportspeople from Kansas City, Kansas
20th-century African-American sportspeople